A whipstaff, sometimes called a whip, is a steering device that was used on 16th- and 17th-century European sailing ships.  Its development preceded the invention of the more complex ship's wheel and followed the simple use of a tiller to control the steering of a ship underway.

Before the 16th century, most sailing vessels were sufficiently small that they could be steered by a single individual working the handle of the tiller, which was directly connected to the rudder stock and therefore the rudder.  However, as ships became taller and broader, there came a need for a steering device which could stretch from the top deck of the stern down to the tiller, which was sometimes located more than a deck below. The whipstaff became the temporary solution.

In a typical arrangement, an iron gooseneck was fitted at the fore end of the tiller. Then, a metal ring was fitted over this and secured with a pin. The ring was attached to a long, thin pole (the whipstaff proper) and this pole connected the tiller to the helmsman one or more decks above it through a pivot point, roll, or rowle, described as "that round piece of wood or iron wherein the whip doth go and is made turn about that it may carry over the whip from side to side with more ease."  The helmsman himself still usually did not stand on the topmost deck, but rather viewed what lay ahead of the ship through a small port or hatchway in the deck above him called a companion.  To move the ship to port, the forward-facing helmsman pulled the top of the staff to his left and pushed the pole down and to the right; to move it to starboard, he pulled the top to his right and pushed the pole down and to the left.  In this fashion, the tiller might get as much as 20° of turn though angles of between 5° and 10° seem more likely.  The tiller rested on a very strong horizontal wooden bar called the tiller sweep, which was sheathed in metal and coated with soap and grease to minimize the drag of the tiller as it rode across it.

This arrangement, however, meant that the helmsman still had very limited range of control of the tiller's movement (no more than 15° to either side) and he had to steer either with extremely limited views of the sails or sometimes dependent entirely upon the conn for direction.  Emphasis had to be placed on the use of sails to control the ship's course, and this was imprecise and depended on the vicissitudes of the wind.  Where extreme movement of the rudder was necessary, the use of relieving tackle had to be implemented.

References

Control devices
Sailboat components
Sailing ship components